Kirsty-Leigh Porter (born 30 December 1988) is an English actress, known for her roles in British soap operas, including portraying Zoe Willson on Coronation Street, Roz Fielding on Emmerdale and Leela Lomax on Hollyoaks.

Career
Porter attended Oldham Theatre Workshop and trained extensively in dance including ballet, jazz, contemporary and modern dance. She has played a number of small roles on British television, including Doctors, The Royal Today, Shameless and Ashes to Ashes. Porter went on to have larger roles in the children's television programme My Spy Family, as Marcy, and The Street as Ellie.

It was announced in July 2009 that Porter had been cast in the long-running ITV soap opera Coronation Street as the girlfriend of long established character David Platt (Jack P. Shepherd). After her role in Coronation Street, Porter was cast in another ITV soap, Emmerdale, as the best friend of Holly Barton (Sophie Powles). Her role in Emmerdale as Roz, included pushing Holly into taking illegal drugs, and stealing to fuel her addiction. At the end of the storyline, it was announced that Porter would be leaving the soap. On 26 June 2013, it was announced that Porter would be joining the cast of Hollyoaks and over a month later it was announced she would play Leela Lomax, one of established character Ste Hay's (Kieron Richardson) two half-sisters.

Filmography

Awards and nominations

References

External links

 

1988 births
21st-century English actresses
Actresses from Manchester
English soap opera actresses
English television actresses
Living people